Burji La (or Burji Pass) is a natural pass in the Karakoram mountains between Skardu and Deosai National Park in Gilgit Baltistan, Pakistan. Its elevation is 5000 meters. It is famous especially for its beautiful panoramic view of many mountain peaks, including that of K2, Nanga Parbat, Masherbrum, Chogolisa, Laila Peak, Golden Peak, Gasherbrum I, Gasherbrum II, Gasherbrum IV and a part of Broad Peak mountain.

See also
Machulo La

References

External links

Mountain passes of Gilgit-Baltistan
Mountain passes of the Karakoram